Kęstutis Glaveckas (30 April 1949 – 30 April 2021) was a Lithuanian politician.

Glaveckas was born and died in Vilnius. In 1990, he was among those who signed the Act of the Re-Establishment of the State of Lithuania.

References

 Biography

1949 births
2021 deaths
Politicians from Vilnius
Members of the Seimas
21st-century Lithuanian politicians
Signatories of the Act of the Re-Establishment of the State of Lithuania